Albert Calmes, born 26 February 1881 in Paris and died 22 September 1967 in Luxembourg city, was a Luxembourgish economist and historian.

He was one of the first people to return to Luxembourg with a doctorate in economics. Previously he had taught at universities in Germany and Switzerland. He became a director of ARBED and received the title Ministre plénipotentiaire honoraire.

While teaching at Frankfurt University he was commissioned by the League of Nations to investigate the financial situation in the recently founded Principality of Albania. His report was published in 1922.

As a historian, he dealt primarily with the history of Luxembourg in the 19th century.

He was the father of Christian Calmes.

Works 
 Histoire contemporaine du Grand-Duché de Luxembourg in 5 volumes:
 Vol. I - Naissance et débuts du Grand-Duché (1814-1830); Luxembourg, Saint-Paul, 1971 (new version of a previous work that was published in 1932 in Brussels; edited by Christian Calmes); 569 pages
 Vol. II - Le Grand-Duché de Luxembourg dans la Révolution belge (1830-1839); Luxembourg, Saint-Paul, 1982 (new edition; 1st edition: Brussels, 1939); 423 pages
 Vol. III - La restauration de Guillaume Ier, roi des Pays-Bas - L'ère Hassenpflug (1839-1840); Brussels (L'Édition universelle) and Luxembourg (Saint-Paul), 1947; 424 pages
 Vol. IV - La création d'un État (1841-1847); Luxembourg, Saint-Paul, 1983 (new edition; 1st edition 1954); 473 pages
 Vol. V - La Révolution de 1848 au Luxembourg; Luxembourg, Saint-Paul, 1982 (new edition; 1st edition 1957); 301 pages
Christian Calmes later continued this series with four volumes (Vol. 7, Vol. 8, Vol. 10 and Vol. 11). He also wrote a Vol. 12 (1815-1989). Volumes 6 and 9 were never written.

 Au fil de l'histoire (3 volumes by Albert Calmes; series was continued by Christian Calmes) :
 Vol. I - Luxembourg, Saint-Paul, 1968 (new edition 1979); 286 pages
 Vol. II - Luxembourg, Saint-Paul, 1988 (3rd edition); 305 pages
 Vol. III (with Christian Calmes)- Luxembourg, Saint-Paul, 1972 (2nd edition); 273 pages
 Das Geldsystem des Grossherzogtums Luxemburg; Leipzig, 1907.
 La comptabilité industrielle, Payot, Paris, 1922.
 Der Zollanschluss des Grossherzogtums Luxemburg an Deutschland; 2 volumes, Luxembourg, Joseph Beffort, 1919 :
 Vol. I - Der Eintritt Luxemburgs in den Deutschen Zollverein (1839 -1842);
 Vol. II - Die Fortdauer des Anschlusses und seine Lösung (1842-1918).

Legacy 
Rue Albert Calmes in Luxembourg city is named after him.

Honours 
 Grand Cross of the Order of Leopold II (1950)
 Grand Officer of the Order of the Oak Crown (1960)

References

Further reading
 Jacques Maas, La révolution de 1848 n'a pas eu lieu - L'historiographie de tradition orangiste et l'oeuvre d'Albert Calmes; in: forum (Luxembourg), No. 185 (July 1998), p. 52-53.

External links
 

20th-century Luxembourgian historians
1881 births
1967 deaths
20th-century economists